Radio România Regional is, in fact, the national network of regional state owned radio stations.

These are, as follows:
 Radio București FM
 Radio Cluj
 Radio Constanța
 Radio Iași
 Radio Oltenia Craiova
 Radio Târgu Mureș
 Radio Reșița
 Radio Timișoara
 Radio Vacanța

References

External links
 Radio România Regional website

Radio stations in Romania
Romanian-language radio stations
Multilingual broadcasters
Radio stations established in 1939
1939 establishments in Romania